The Bridge at Falling Creek is a historic stone arch bridge located near Richmond, in Chesterfield County, Virginia. It was built about 1823 of rough-cut, uncoursed granite. It is carried by two semicircular barrel arches with voussoirs of rough-finished granite. It carried the southbound lanes of U.S. Route 301 until 1977, when it was put out of service. It is accessible from a wayside that includes the Falling Creek UDC Jefferson Davis Highway Marker. The bridge was partially damaged in 2004 but still remains significant. It was listed on the National Register of Historic Places in 1995.

See also
List of bridges on the National Register of Historic Places in Virginia

References

Road bridges on the National Register of Historic Places in Virginia
Bridges completed in 1823
Buildings and structures in Chesterfield County, Virginia
National Register of Historic Places in Chesterfield County, Virginia
U.S. Route 301
Stone arch bridges in the United States